East Rancho Dominguez, also known as East Compton, is an unincorporated community and census-designated place (CDP) located in southern Los Angeles County, California. The population was 15,135 at the 2010 census, up from 9,286 at the 2000 census. East Rancho Dominguez is an accepted city name according to the USPS, and shares the 90221 ZIP Code with Compton.

East Rancho Dominguez is an unincorporated enclave surrounded by Compton within five blocks east and west of Atlantic Ave. Alondra Boulevard is the southern border, and three blocks north of Rosecrans Ave. is roughly the northern border. East Rancho Dominguez County Park is in the center of the community.

To the north is the city of Lynwood. To the east is the Long Beach Freeway, the Los Angeles River, and then the city of Paramount. To the south and southeast is the city of Long Beach.

Its sphere of influence is the city of Compton, which has tried to annex East Rancho Dominguez, but business and property owners in the area have opposed the annexation. Rancho Dominguez is a separate unincorporated, mostly industrial area south of the city of Compton.

Geography
East Compton is located at  (33.897748, -118.194093).

Demographics

2010
The 2010 United States Census reported that East Rancho Dominguez had a population of 15,135. The racial makeup of East Rancho Dominguez was 4,774 (31.5%) White (1.1% Non-Hispanic White), 2,404 (15.9%) African American, 133 (0.9%) Native American, 33 (0.2%) Asian, 109 (0.7%) Pacific Islander, 7,156 (47.3%) from other races, and 526 (3.5%) from two or more races. Hispanic or Latino of any race were 12,407 persons (82.0%).

The Census reported that 14,946 people (98.8% of the population) lived in households, 183 (1.2%) lived in non-institutionalized group quarters, and 6 (0%) were institutionalized.

There were 2,996 households, out of which 2,036 (68.0%) had children under the age of 18 living in them, 1,626 (54.3%) were opposite-sex married couples living together, 739 (24.7%) had a female householder with no husband present, 302 (10.1%) had a male householder with no wife present.  There were 228 (7.6%) unmarried opposite-sex partnerships, and 24 (0.8%) same-sex married couples or partnerships. 228 households (7.6%) were made up of individuals, and 74 (2.5%) had someone living alone who was 65 years of age or older. The average household size was 4.99.  There were 2,667 families (89.0% of all households); the average family size was 4.96.

The population was spread out, with 5,311 people (35.1%) under the age of 18, 1,966 people (13.0%) aged 18 to 24, 4,297 people (28.4%) aged 25 to 44, 2,755 people (18.2%) aged 45 to 64, and 806 people (5.3%) who were 65 years of age or older.  The median age was 26.1 years. For every 100 females, there were 98.0 males.  For every 100 females age 18 and over, there were 96.9 males.

The homeowner vacancy rate was 3.3%; the rental vacancy rate was 5.1%.  8,824 people (58.3% of the population) lived in owner-occupied housing units and 6,122 people (40.4%) lived in rental housing units.

According to the 2010 United States Census, East Rancho Dominguez had a median household income of $44,727, with 20.0% of the population living below the federal poverty line.

2000
As of the census of 2000, there were 9,286 people, 1,849 households, and 1,669 families residing in the CDP. The population density was 17,945.9 inhabitants per square mile (6,894.9/km). The racial makeup of the CDP was 24.69% White, 19.83% Black or African American, 0.70% Native American, 0.15% Asian, 1.17% Pacific Islander, 50.23% from other races, and 3.23% from two or more races. 77.15% of the population were Hispanic or Latino of any race.

There were 1,849 households, out of which 62.5% had children under the age of 18 living with them, 59.5% were married couples living together, 22.4% had a female householder with no husband present, and 9.7% were non-families. 7.5% of all households were made up of individuals, and 2.5% had someone living alone who was 65 years of age or older. The average household size was 5.01 and the average family size was 4.97.

In the CDP, the population was spread out, with 39.8% under the age of 18, 12.9% from 18 to 24, 30.3% from 25 to 44, 13.5% from 45 to 64, and 3.5% who were 65 years of age or older. The median age was 24 years. For every 100 females, there were 99.9 males. For every 100 females age 18 and over, there were 99.4 males.

The median income for a household in the CDP was $31,398, and the median income for a family was $30,160. Males had a median income of $20,573 versus $20,240 for females. The per capita income for the CDP was $8,108. About 31.6% of families and 36.7% of the population were below the poverty line, including 48.2% of those under age 18 and 19.7% of those age 65 or over.

Government

Schools
El Camino College Compton Center
Compton Unified School District

Parks and recreation
Originally East Compton Park,  East Rancho Dominguez Park was completely renovated in 2004 to become one of the most appealing recreational facilities in the South County Community Services Agency. The five-acre park includes a well equipped gymnasium, ample community building, and the tennis courts where Venus Williams and Serena Williams played as children. The park has year-round recreational programs including youth sports, adult basketball leagues, the “Amp It Up!” summer lunch program, after-school snacks, and summer and after-school day camps.

References

External links

East Rancho Dominguez Library
LA County's East Rancho Dominguez Service Center
US Census map

Census-designated places in Los Angeles County, California
Unincorporated communities in Los Angeles County, California
Gateway Cities
Census-designated places in California
Unincorporated communities in California